Kreenheinstetten (municipality Leibertingen) is a village located in the district of Sigmaringen (Baden-Württemberg) in Germany.

Notable Persons 
Abraham a Sancta Clara (1644-1709) born at Kreenheinstetten

Historical monument 

 The birthplace of Abraham a Sancta Clara is still the same inn „Zur Traube“ as at the time of his birth in 1644.

External links 
 Official Homepage of Leibertingen
 The Swabian Highlandgames

Sigmaringen (district)
Baden